Sead Babača (born 30 November 1981) is a Montenegrin retired football midfielder.

Club career
He had previously played with OFK Beograd, FK Jedinstvo Bijelo Polje, FK Proleter Zrenjanin, FK Rudar Pljevlja, FK Zemun and FK Bokelj.

References

1981 births
Living people
People from Bijelo Polje
Association football midfielders
Serbia and Montenegro footballers
Montenegrin footballers
OFK Beograd players
FK Jedinstvo Bijelo Polje players
FK Proleter Zrenjanin players
FK Rudar Pljevlja players
FK Zemun players
FK Bokelj players
FK Berane players
First League of Serbia and Montenegro players
Second League of Serbia and Montenegro players
Montenegrin Second League players
Montenegrin First League players
Montenegrin football managers
FK Jedinstvo Bijelo Polje managers